Dholera Solar Park is a planned, large scale solar project in Dholera Special Investment Region (DSIR), Gujarat. It is categorised as an Ultra Mega Solar Power Project, by the Ministry of New and Renewable Energy of the Central Government of India; the capacity will be 5 GW by 2030.

History

Background 
The Government of India has a target of increasing power generated from renewable energy sources to 175 GW by 2022. The National Solar Mission (NSM) has a target of achieving 100GW of grid-connected power generation from solar energy by 2022. India originally had a target of 20GW by 2022; this target was achieved with four years to go. Following this the Narendra Modi government increased the target to 100GW.

The Chief Minister of Gujarat approved the Dholera Solar Park in April 2018.

Auctions 
Auctions have been held in 2020. An excess response of 600 MW was seen. Five companies were allotted 100-200MW each. In 2018 and 2019 similar cancellations in Gujarat had taken place. These cancelled contracts in Gujarat have resulted Uttar Pradesh also cancelling bids of a 500 MW solar auction.

References 

Solar power stations in Gujarat
Ultra Mega Power Projects